is a near-circular shallow freshwater oxbow lake located some  northeast of Sapporo on the Japanese island of Hokkaidō. Situated in the Ishikari peatlands and formed by the meandering Ishikari River that flows a short distance to the west, with the Kabato Mountains rising behind, there is no river inflow; instead it is fed by rainwater and melting snow, while being drawn on for the irrigation of the surrounding rice fields, developed since the Taishō era. A major stopover for migrating Anatidae, in particular fifty to sixty thousand greater white-fronted geese (Anser albifrons, a national Natural Monument), it has been designated a Ramsar site, as a wetland of international significance, and a Special Wildlife Protection Area. Mr Miyajima's principal crops at this time were soya beans, adzuki beans, and oats, but after major flooding of the Ishikari in 1904, he sold the remainder of his holdings, leaving but his name.

See also

 List of Ramsar sites in Japan
 Hokkaidō Development Commission
 Hokkaidō Heritage

References

External links 
  Miyajima-numa

Lakes of Hokkaido
Ramsar sites in Japan
Bibai, Hokkaido